The SIGMA class is a Dutch-built family of modular naval vessels, of either corvette or frigate size, designed by Damen Group.

SIGMA stands for Ship Integrated Geometrical Modularity Approach. The basic design of the SIGMA Patrol Series can vary as the hull segments are designed as components. Ships can vary in the number of hull segments and in the order in which they are placed.

The design was derived from the earlier High Speed Displacement hull form by Marin Teknikk AS in the 1970s.

Versions
There are three types of Sigma combatants
 Sigma frigate
 Sigma corvette
 Sigma fast attack corvette

Simplified comparisons between the different Sigma models.

There are multiple new SIGMA designs released in early 2015 these are the:
SIGMA 8313
SIGMA 8011
SIGMA 7613
SIGMA 6610

They are likely to be part of the Compact SIGMA series, a new series small sized combatants with shorter range and up to 2 weeks mission endurance with the same combat systems as the larger version.

Users 
 Indonesia operates four SIGMA 9113  and two SIGMA 10514s.
 Mexico operate one SIGMA 10514 LROPV, ARM Benito Juárez (F 101).
 Morocco operates two SIGMA 9813 class heavy corvettes (with VLS) and a SIGMA 10513 class light frigate based on a modified design.

Under construction
 Mexico has ordered 8 SIGMA 10514 LROPV based upon the Indonesian variant with different weapon systems and different role. The Mexican navy will use its SIGMA frigate as a long range patrol vessel. The keel was laid on 17 August 2017, and was launched on 23 November 2018 and service to begin in 2020. The ship will be built in six modules, with two of these modules built by Damen Schelde Naval Shipbuilding in Vlissingen in the Netherlands, and the remaining four by the Mexican Navy shipyard in Salina Cruz under the supervision of Damen Schelde Naval Shipbuilding. The SIGMA will replace the four Allende class (ex-USN ), and two Bravo class (ex-USN ) of frigates.

Under development
 In September 2022, the Colombian Ministry of Defense announced that COTECMAR and Damen will co-develop five new frigates for the Colombian Navy based on the Sigma-class design. The Colombian Navy awarded a contract to COTECMAR to build the service's first frigate under the Strategic Surface Platform (Plataforma Estratégica de Superficie or PES) project on 22 November 2022. It is estimated that the ship's design will be finalized by mid-2023, and the construction can begin by 2025.

Potential operators
 Greece - Damen Schelde submitted a proposal to the Hellenic Navy for SIGMA 10514HN Corvetes based on the SIGMA 10514. This proposal along with Naval Group's proposal for Gowind 2500 are the 2 candidates for the future Hellenic Navy's corvettes to replace the older Elli-class frigates
 Malaysia - Although SIGMA-class design not be chosen as Littoral Combat Ship (LCS) program, Damen with Malaysian shipyard, Gading Marine has offered their improved SIGMA 9113 LMS design for RMN Littoral Mission Ship (LMS) second batch during Defence Services Asia 2022 (DSA 2022).
 Peru - The Peruvian Navy plans to acquire between three and six ships, with a displacement of 3,000 to 4,000 tons. During the 6th International Exhibition of Technology in Defense and Prevention of Natural Disasters (Sitdef 2017) Damen Group offered the SIGMA-class design to the Peruvian Navy. It believes that the variety of models of frigates offered by the SIGMA series allows to fit without difficulty to the requirements of the Peruvian Navy.
 Poland - Damen Schelde submitted its SIGMA PL 10514 in two variants for the competition to supply the Polish Navy with options for their Miecznik & Czapla programmes. Miecznik will be a coastal defense ship and Czapla a patrol ship.

Failed bids 
 Egypt - Damen Schelde was in competition for four SIGMA corvettes (+ two options) for the Egyptian Navy. The French Gowind-class corvette won this bid. The other competitor was the TKMS MEKO A200.
 Malaysia - Damen Schelde participated in the competition to supply the Royal Malaysian Navy with six frigates under the Second Generation Patrol Vessel program. It was chosen as the winner but unfortunately, Malaysia's Defence Minister had changed the result to the French Gowind class due to interference from Boustead Naval Shipyard. The other competitor was the MEKO A200.
 Oman - Oman had an interest in buying four SIGMA corvettes/frigates in March 2011. The Dutch queen Beatrix planned a state visit to Oman, one of the reasons for the visit being the potential sale of the ships to the Royal Navy of Oman. The official visit was cancelled due to the unrest in Oman at the time, although the queen did go to an unofficial dinner with the Sultan of Oman. The official visit took place later in January 2012. During the first visit to Oman, the Royal Netherlands Navy sent its air defence warfare frigate  to Muscat. In April 2012 it was announced that they lost to the Singaporean  by ST Engineering. Damen had offered the SIGMA 7513.
 Philippines - Damen Schelde bought bidding documents but did not submit an offer.
 Romania - Romania is planning to purchase four corvettes in the upcoming seven years, which have to be built and equipped in a Romanian building yard. Previously, in December 2016, the Romanian government decided that Damen Group would build four SIGMA light frigates for 1.6 billion euro at the Damen Galați Shipyard. However, the new Romanian government is repealing this decision and will re-open the procurement again. Nonetheless, Damen Group is a top contender for the job, since it has the only shipyard in Romania that has recent experience with building new naval ships reasonably fast and at a competitive price. In July 2019, the Romanian authorities announced the selection of Naval Group and its partner Santierul Naval Constanta (SNC) for the programme to build four new Gowind multi-mission corvettes.
 United Arab Emirates - Damen had submitted an offer (likely the SIGMA 9813 or SIGMA 9814) for the s. It lost to a corvette based on the Italian .
 Vietnam - Vietnam in 2011 shows interest in buying four SIGMA corvette with two of them to be built by DSNS in Vietnam. The design were revealed to be SIGMA 9814 during Vietship 2014 Nava Exhibition in Vietnam. As of 2016 the program seems to be cancelled.

Indonesian Navy variants

SIGMA 9113 

The Indonesian variant is based on the SIGMA 9113 design. Work on the first of the class, KRI Diponegoro, began with the first steel cutting conducted in October 2004. The ship was christened on 16 September 2006 and commissioned on 2 July 2007 by Admiral Slamet Soebijanto, Indonesian Navy Chief of Staff.

Options for two other units were exercised in January 2006 with the first steel cut commenced on 3 April 2006 in Damen's Schelde Naval Shipbuilding yard, Vlissingen-Oost yard and not in Surabaya as stated earlier.

On 28 August 2007, Jane's Missiles and Rockets reported that Indonesia was having problems securing the export license for the MM40 Exocet block II and was considering Chinese made C-802 anti-ship missiles as alternatives. However, the ships have already been delivered with the Exocet missiles.

In 2018 Thales has upgraded the Indonesian Navy's Diponegoro-class corvette through the installation and refurbishment of the Kingklip hull-mounted sonar system.

In 2019 the Diponegoro-class corvettes were upgraded with MM40 Exocet block III missile.

On 31 August 2021, Terma announced that they have been awarded a contract for the upgrade of existing C-Guard systems with Anti-Submarine Warfare (ASW) capabilities for the Sigma-Class Corvettes of the Indonesian Navy. This C-Guard ASW upgrade program is a follow-on from the previous ASW upgrade contract awarded in 2019 for the same class of ships.

On 4 November 2022, Thales has signed a contract with PT. Len to undertake the refurbishment of the integrated mission systems for Diponegoro-class ships. The corvettes will be updated with Thales TACTICOS Baseline 2 combat management system (CMS) and the Naval Smarter (NS) NS50 radar system.

SIGMA 10514 

On the 16 August 2010, Indonesian Defense Ministry, signed a deal with PT PAL Indonesia and Damen Schelde to build a 105-meter frigate in Indonesia based on Damen Schelde SIGMA 10514 design. For the first ship, five modules for the ship will be built in Indonesia and the Dutch manufacturer Damen Schelde will build 2 modules while for the second ship the Indonesians will build six modules and Damen Schelde will build one module.

On 1 February 2013 it was announced that a second unit will be built by Damen Schelde Naval Shipbuilding and PT PAL Surabaya, the second contract includes torpedo tubes, combat control room and a couple of surface weapons.

They were built without several of their main system and equipment, namely VL-MICA, MM40 Exocet block III, Rheinmetall Millennium CIWS, Electronic warfare system and were planned to be installed later on (FFBNW).

As of December 2015, the first ship, KRI Raden Eddy Martadinata (331), was 85% complete and the ship was launched on 18 January 2016. On 7 April 2017 the first ship, KRI Raden Eddy Martadinata (331), was commissioned at Tanjung Priok. The second ship, KRI I Gusti Ngurah Rai (332), was commissioned on 10 January 2018.

The class finally received their full complement of FFBNW system and equipment in December 2019 for KRI Raden Eddy Martadinata (331) and March 2020 for KRI I Gusti Ngurah Rai (332).

Moroccan Navy variants 

On 6 February 2008, Morocco signed a USD$1.2 billion contract with Schelde Naval Shipbuilding for two light frigate SIGMA 9813 and one light frigate SIGMA 10513, which are modified versions of the existing SIGMA-class design.

A subsequent contract was signed on 1 April 2008 with Thales Nederland for the supply and installation of the command and control and sensor package for the ships. The package included TACTICOS combat management system, SMART-S Mk2 surveillance radar, LIROD Mk2 tracking radar, Thales KINGKLIP sonar system, IFF system, Integrated communication system comprising external communication system and FOCON internal communication system, two Target Designation Sights, VIGILE ESM system, SCORPION ECM system, and the integrated navigation system.

The first frigate for Morocco, Tarik ben Ziyad, was launched in July 2010, began sea trials on 6 May 2011 and was delivered on 12 September 2011. The second ship was launched on 2 February 2011, with sea trials planned for late in the year. The third ship was planned to be launched in September 2011.

Mexican Navy variant 

On 18 August 2017, Damen announced the keel laying for one SIGMA 10514 Long Range Ocean Patrol Vessel  (SIGMA 10514 LROPV/ SIGMA 10514 POLA) at Damen Schelde Naval Shipyard in Vlissingen for the Mexican Navy. The vessel was constructed modularly in six modules, two modules were constructed in Vlissingen and the other four modules in Mexico.

According to the Defense Security Cooperation Agency Major Arms Sale notification on 5 January 2018, the primary weapon systems for the SIGMA class will include RGM-84L Harpoon Block II, RIM-162 ESSM with eight cell MK 56 VLS launcher, MK 54 Mod 0 lightweight torpedoes with two MK 32 Surface Vessel Torpedo Tubes (SVTT) triple tube launchers, Block II Rolling Airframe Missile (RAM) missiles and Bofors 57 mm gun.

In April 2018 Damen Group contracted Spanish defense technology company Indra to equip the Mexican Navy's new long-range offshore patrol vessel (POLA) with its RIGEL electronic defense system.

Ships of the class

See also
 List of naval ship classes in service
 Martadinata-class frigate (an Indonesian frigate class based on the SIGMA 10514 design)

References

External links

 SIGMA Class Frigates (FMMM), Morocco
 SIGMA 10513 Tarik Ben Ziad Frigate – Royal Moroccan Navy
 SIGMA 9813 Frigates Sultan Moulay Ismail & Allal Ben Abdellah – Royal Moroccan Navy
 Sigma 10514 PKR Frigate – Indonesia Navy (TNI AL)
 Commonality and similarity in DAMEN SIGMA designs
 SIGMA corvettes
 SIGMA Frigate
 SMART-S Mk2 Medium to Long Range (S-Band) Solid State Surveillance Radar

Corvette classes
Frigate classes
Corvettes of the Netherlands
Corvettes of the Indonesian Navy
Corvettes of the Royal Moroccan Navy